The Prime Minister of the Gambia, known as the Chief Minister from 1961–1962, was the head of government in the Gambia Colony and Protectorate, and later The Gambia, from 1961 to 1970. The position was only held by two people, Pierre Sarr N'Jie and Dawda Jawara.

Prime ministers, 1961–1970
Political parties

See also

 The Gambia
 Heads of State of the Gambia
 Colonial Heads of the Gambia
 Lists of office-holders

References
 http://www.rulers.org/rulg1.html#gambia

 
Prime ministers
Gambia
Gambia